Stan Johns (28 June 1924 – 1985 )   was an English footballer who played as an inside forward for South Liverpool and West Ham United.

Playing career
Born in Liverpool, Johns came to the attention of local teams Liverpool and Everton but decided to join  West Ham United in 1950. Johns scored in his first two games for West Ham, against Cardiff City and Blackburn Rovers, played only four more games, without scoring, and was not selected again.

He died in 1985.

References

1924 births
1985 deaths
English footballers
English Football League players
West Ham United F.C. players
Association football forwards
Footballers from Liverpool
South Liverpool F.C. players